

The Sopwith Two-Seat Scout (or Type 880) was a 1910s British biplane Anti-Zeppelin scout biplane designed and built for the Admiralty by the Sopwith Aviation Company. It was nicknamed the Spinning Jenny due to a tendency to enter a spin.

Design and development
First flown in November 1914 the Two-Seat Scout was developed from the 1914 Circuit of Britain seaplane. It was two-bay unswept biplane with equal span wings and ailerons fitted on all four wings and a braced tailplane and a single rudder. It had a fixed tailskid landing gear with a cross-axle type main gear with twin wheels carried on vee legs under the fuselage. It was powered by a nose-mounted 100 hp (75 kW) Gnome Monosoupape rotary engine driving a two-bladed propeller. It had two tandem open cockpits and could carry small bombs under the fuselage.

Operators

Royal Naval Air Service

Specifications

See also

References

 

1910s British bomber aircraft
Two-Seat Scout
Aircraft first flown in 1914
Rotary-engined aircraft